A distribution transformer or service transformer is a transformer that provides the final voltage transformation in the electric power distribution system, stepping down the voltage used in the distribution lines to the level used by the customer.
The invention of a practical efficient transformer made AC power distribution feasible; a system using distribution transformers was demonstrated as early as 1882.

If mounted on a utility pole, they are called pole-mount transformers. If the distribution lines are located at ground level or underground, distribution transformers are mounted on concrete pads and locked in steel cases, thus known as distribution tap pad-mount transformers.

Distribution transformers normally have ratings less than 200 kVA, although some national standards can allow for units up to 5000 kVA to be described as distribution transformers. Since distribution transformers are energized for 24 hours a day (even when they don't carry any load), reducing iron losses has an important role in their design. As they usually don't operate at full load, they are designed to have maximum efficiency at lower loads. To have a better efficiency, voltage regulation in these transformers should be kept to a minimum. Hence they are designed to have small leakage reactance.

Types

Distribution transformers are classified into different categories based on factors such as:
 Mounting location – pole, pad, underground vault
 Type of insulation – liquid-immersed or dry-type 
 Number of phases – single-phase or three-phase 
 Voltage class 	
 Basic impulse insulation level (BIL).

Use
Distribution transformers are normally located at a service drop, where wires run from a utility pole or underground power lines to a customer's premises. They are often used for the power supply of facilities outside settlements, such as isolated houses, farmyards or pumping stations at voltages below 30 kV. Another application is the power supply of the overhead wire of railways electrified with AC. In this case single phase distribution transformers are used.

The number of customers fed by a single distribution transformer varies depending on the number of customers in an area. Several homes may be fed from a single transformer in urban areas. Rural distribution may require one transformer per customer, depending on mains voltage. A large commercial or industrial complex will have multiple distribution transformers. In urban areas and neighborhoods where the primary distribution lines run underground, padmount transformers, transformers in locked metal enclosures mounted on a concrete pad, are used. Many large buildings have electric service provided at primary distribution voltage. These buildings have customer-owned transformers in the basement for step-down purposes.

Distribution transformers are also found in the power collection networks of wind farms, where they step up power from each wind turbine to connect to a substation that may be several miles (kilometres) distant.

Connections

Both pole-mounted and pad-mounted transformers convert the high 'primary' voltage of the overhead or underground distribution lines to the lower 'secondary' or 'utilization' voltage inside the building. The primary distribution wires use the three-phase system. Main distribution lines always have three 'hot' wires plus an optional neutral. In the North American system, where single-phase transformers connect to only one phase wire, smaller 'lateral' lines branching off on side roads may include only one or two 'hot' phase wires. (When there is only one phase wire, a neutral will always be provided as a return path.) Primaries provide power at the standard distribution voltages used in the area; these range from as low as 2.3 kV to about 35 kV depending on local distribution practice and standards; often 11 kV (50 Hz systems) and 13.8 kV (60 Hz systems) are used, but many other voltages are common. For example, in the United States, the most common voltage is 12.47 kV, which has a line-to-ground voltage of 7.2 kV. This has a 7.2 kV phase-to-neutral voltage, exactly 30 times the 240 V on the split-phase secondary side.

Primary

The high voltage primary windings are brought out to bushings on the top of the case. 
Single phase transformers, generally used in the North American system, are attached to the overhead distribution wires with two different types of connections:
Wye – On a wye distribution circuit, a 'wye' or 'phase to neutral' transformer is used. A single phase wye transformer usually has only one bushing on top, connected to one of the three primary phases. The other end of the primary winding is connected to the transformer case, which is connected to the neutral wire of the wye system, and is also grounded. A wye distribution system is preferred because the transformers present unbalanced loads on the line that cause currents in the neutral wire and are then grounded. But with a delta distribution system the unbalanced loads can cause variations in the voltages on the 3 phase wires.
Delta – On a delta distribution circuit, a 'delta' or 'phase to phase' transformer is used. A single phase delta transformer has two bushings connected to two of the three primary wires, so the primary winding sees the phase-to-phase voltage. This avoids returning primary current through a neutral that must be solidly grounded to keep its voltage near earth potential. Since the neutral is also provided to customers, this is a big safety advantage in a dry area like California where soil conductivity is low. The main disadvantage is higher cost, e.g., from needing at least two insulated 'hot' phase wires even on a branch circuit. Another smaller disadvantage is that if only one of the primary phases is disconnected upstream it will remain live as the transformers try to return current through it. This could be a hazard to line workers.
Transformers providing three-phase secondary power, which are used for residential service in the European system, have three primary windings attached to all three primary phase wires. The windings are almost always connected in a 'wye' configuration, with the ends of the three windings connected and grounded.
The transformer is always connected to the primary distribution lines through protective fuses and disconnect switches. For pole-mounted transformers this is usually a 'fused cutout'. An electrical fault melts the fuse and the device drops open to give a visual indication of trouble. It can also be manually opened while the line is energized by lineworkers using insulated hot sticks. In some cases completely self protected transformers are used, which have a circuit breaker built in, so a fused cutout isn't needed.

Secondary

The low voltage secondary windings are attached to three or four terminals on the transformer's side.
In North American residences and small businesses, the secondary is most often the split-phase 120/240 volt system. The 240 V secondary winding is center-tapped and the center neutral wire is grounded, making the two end conductors "hot" with respect to the center tap and 180 degrees out of phase with each other. These three wires run down the service drop to the electric meter and service panel inside the building. Connecting a load between either hot wire and the neutral gives 120 volts, which is used for lighting circuits. Connecting between both hot wires gives 240 volts, which is used for heavy loads such as air conditioners, ovens, dryers and electric vehicle charging stations.
In Europe and countries using its system, the secondary is often the three phase 400Y/230 system. There are three 230 V secondary windings, each receiving power from a primary winding attached to one of the primary phases. One end of each secondary winding is connected to a 'neutral' wire, which is grounded. The other end of the 3 secondary windings, along with the neutral, are brought down the service drop to the service panel. 230 V loads are connected between any of the three phase wires and the neutral. Because the phases are 120 degrees with respect to each other, the voltage between any two phases is sqrt(3) * 230V = 400V, as compared to the 2 * 120V = 240V in the North American split phase system. While three-phase power is almost unheard of in individual North American residences, it is common in Europe for heavy loads such as air conditioners and electric vehicle chargers.

Construction

Distribution transformers consist of a magnetic core made from laminations of sheet silicon steel (transformer steel) stacked and either glued together with resin or banded together with steel straps, with the primary and secondary wire windings wrapped around them. This core construction is designed to reduce core losses, dissipation of magnetic energy as heat in the core, which are an economically important cause of power loss in utility grids. Core losses are caused by two effects; hysteresis loss in the steel, and eddy currents. Silicon steel has low hysteresis loss, and the laminated construction prevents eddy currents from flowing in the core, which dissipate power in the resistance of the steel. Efficiency of typical distribution transformers is between about 98 and 99 percent. Where large numbers of transformers are made to standard designs, a wound C-shaped core is economic to manufacture. A steel strip is wrapped around a former, pressed into shape and then cut into two C-shaped halves, which are re-assembled on the copper windings.

The primary coils are wound from enamel coated copper or aluminum wire and the high current, low voltage secondaries are wound using a thick ribbon of aluminum or copper. The windings are insulated with resin-impregnated paper. The entire assembly is baked to cure the resin and then submerged in a powder coated steel tank which is then filled with transformer oil (or other insulating liquid), which is inert and non-conductive. The transformer oil cools and insulates the windings, and protects them from moisture. The tank is temporarily evacuated during manufacture to remove any remaining moisture that would cause arcing and is sealed against the weather with a gasket at the top.

Formerly, distribution transformers for indoor use would be filled with a polychlorinated biphenyl (PCB) liquid. Because these chemicals persist in the environment and have adverse effects on animals, they have been banned. Other fire-resistant liquids such as silicones are used where a liquid-filled transformer must be used indoors. Certain vegetable oils have been applied as transformer oil; these have the advantage of a high fire point and are completely biodegradable in the environment.

Pole-mounted transformers often include accessories such as surge arresters or protective fuse links. A self-protected transformer includes an internal fuse and surge arrester; other transformers have these components mounted separately outside the tank. Pole-mounted transformers may have lugs allowing direct mounting to a pole, or may be mounted on crossarms bolted to the pole. Aerial transformers, larger than around 75 kVA, may be mounted on a platform supported by one or more poles. A three-phase service may use three identical transformers, one per phase.

Transformers designed for below-grade installation can be designed for periodic submersion in water.

Distribution transformers may include an off-load tap changer to allow slight adjustment of the ratio between primary and secondary voltage, to bring the customer's voltage within the desired range on long or heavily loaded lines.

Pad-mounted transformers have secure locked, bolted' and grounded metal enclosures to discourage unauthorized access to live internal parts. The enclosure may also include fuses, isolating switches, load-break bushings, and other accessories as described in technical standards. Pad-mounted transformers for distribution systems typically range from around 100 to 2000 kVA, although some larger units are also used.

Installation

While in America distribution transformers are often installed outdoors on mostly wooden poles, in Europe it is most common to install them into buildings. These look like towers, if the feeding lines are overhead. If all lines running to the transformer are underground lines small buildings from the size of a container are used.
Nevertheless also in Europe distribution transformers mounted on poles are used in rural areas, whereby the pole is usually made of concrete or iron as the transformers have a great weight.

See also
Bushing (electrical)
Transformer types
Current transformer

References

Bibliography 
 
 
  
 

Electric transformers
Electric power distribution